The eleventh season of the American television medical drama Grey's Anatomy premiered on September 25, 2014, in the United States on the American Broadcasting Company (ABC) and consists of 25 episodes. The season was produced by ABC Studios, in association with Shondaland Production Company and The Mark Gordon Company; the showrunners being Stacy McKee and William Harper. The season commenced airing with the episode "I Must Have Lost It On The Wind" and concluded with the season finale "You're My Home" airing on May 14, 2015. The season was officially released on DVD as a 6-disc boxset under the title of Grey's Anatomy: The Complete Eleventh Season – Life Changes on August 18, 2015, by Buena Vista Home Entertainment.

The season is the first in which Dr. Cristina Yang, portrayed by Sandra Oh, is not included in the main cast of characters following her departure in previous season's finale. The season's main storylines include Meredith Grey (Ellen Pompeo) dealing with "her person's" departure, her problematic love-life with her husband Derek Shepherd (Patrick Dempsey), and the arrival of Dr. Maggie Pierce (Kelly McCreary), whom Meredith learns is her half-sister. The biggest storyline of the season was the death of Derek who is involved in a car accident in "How to Save a Life." Other story-arcs include Amelia Shepherd (Caterina Scorsone) moving to Seattle, learning the ropes at Grey Sloan Memorial Hospital, Callie Torres (Sara Ramirez) and Arizona Robbins (Jessica Capshaw) try to save their marriage by going to marriage counseling,  April Kepner (Sarah Drew) and Jackson Avery (Jesse Williams) end up having a boy, named Samuel, who dies moments after birth having been diagnosed to have osteogenesis imperfecta, a lethal birth defect. The season also focuses on the deepening friendship between Meredith and Alex Karev (Justin Chambers) causing problems for him and girlfriend Jo Wilson (Camilla Luddington).

The season ended with 11.08 million viewers ranking #36 overall in total viewers. This is much lower than the tenth season, which was ranked #15. In the 18–49 key demographic, Grey's Anatomy ranked #13 down 8 places from the previous season, it is the lowest ranking in the series' history. For the 2014-2015 Primetime TV schedule, it was the #5 drama in the 18–49 key demographic. The season was well received among television critics with several praising the writing and performances of the cast, with lead Ellen Pompeo's performance receiving high critical acclaim. In terms of awards and accolades the season garnered 6 nominations at the 41st People's Choice Awards winning 4 including Favorite Network TV Drama, Dempsey and Pompeo won Favorite Dramatic TV Actor and Actress respectively and Oh winning for Favorite TV Character We Miss Most. On May 7, 2015, ABC announced the renewal of Grey's Anatomy for a twelfth season as part of their 2015-16 TV lineup.

Episodes 

The number in the "No. overall" column refers to the episode's number within the overall series, whereas the number in the "No. in season" column refers to the episode's number within this particular season. "U.S. viewers in millions" refers to the number of Americans in millions who watched the episodes live. Each episode of this season is named after a song.

Cast and characters

Main 
 Ellen Pompeo as Dr. Meredith Grey
 Justin Chambers as Dr. Alex Karev
 Chandra Wilson as Dr. Miranda Bailey
 James Pickens Jr. as Dr. Richard Webber
 Sara Ramirez as Dr. Callie Torres
 Kevin McKidd as Dr. Owen Hunt
 Jessica Capshaw as Dr. Arizona Robbins
 Sarah Drew as Dr. April Kepner
 Jesse Williams as Dr. Jackson Avery
 Caterina Scorsone as Dr. Amelia Shepherd
 Camilla Luddington as Dr. Jo Wilson
 Jerrika Hinton as Dr. Stephanie Edwards
 Kelly McCreary as Dr. Maggie Pierce
 Patrick Dempsey as Dr. Derek Shepherd

Recurring 
 Jason George as Dr. Ben Warren
 Giacomo Gianniotti as Dr. Andrew DeLuca
 Geena Davis as Dr. Nicole Herman
 Debbie Allen as Dr. Catherine Avery
 Kate Burton as  Dr. Ellis Grey
 Nicholas D'Agosto as Dr. Graham Maddox
 Sally Pressman as Young Ellis Grey
 Aria Leabu as Young Meredith Grey
 Connie Ray as Karen Kepner
 Kevin Alejandro as Dan Pruitt
 Nicole Cummins as Paramedic Nicole
 Heather Matarazzo as Joan Paulson
 Joe Adler as Dr. Isaac Cross
Irene Keng as Dr. Audrey Shaw
 Joe Dinicol as Dr. Mitchell Spencer
 Samantha Sloyan as Dr. Penelope Blake

Notable guests 
 J. August Richards as Young Richard Webber
 Patrick Fabian as Dr. Oliver Lebackes
 Rebecca Field as Sabine McNeil
 Debra Mooney as Evelyn Hunt
 Billy Malone as Jon McNeil
 Annet Mahendru as Ana
 Kiralee Hayashi as Tracey Mitchell 
 Chad James Buchanan as Brian 
 Taylor John Smith as Nick 
 Ajiona Alexus as Marissa McKay
 Sydney Sweeney as Erin Weaver
 Nicole Sullivan as JJ
 Elizabeth Ann Bennett as Ann
 Millie Bobby Brown as Ruby

Production

Development 
Grey's Anatomy was renewed for an eleventh season by ABC on May 8, 2014. On May 13, 2014, ABC announced their new schedule, as well as a new timeslot for Grey's Anatomy. The show remained on Thursday night, but it was moved to 8:00 PM E.T. to make room for ShondaLand Production Company's new TV series, How to Get Away with Murder. Even though Paul Lee, the president of ABC, moved Grey's Anatomy to a new timeslot, he announced at ABC's 2014-15 upfront that the eleventh season would air in the same order as the previous season with 2 batches consisting of 12 interrupted episodes. 

For the 2014-15 TV season, ABC programmed its entire Thursday primetime lineup with Shondaland dramas Grey's Anatomy, Scandal and How To Get Away With Murder, then branded the night as "Thank God It's Thursday" (or "TGIT"). This echoes ABC's former TGIF branding of its Friday night family sitcoms and even NBC's Must See TV promotion of formidable Thursday night television hits in the 1990s.

The remaining fall schedule for ABC was announced on October 30, 2014, where it was announced that Grey's Anatomy would be split into 2 batches. However, instead of the 12 and 12, there will be 8 episodes in the fall which will end with a winter finale on November 20, 2014, like the rest of ABC's primetime lineup "TGIT" Scandal and How To Get Away with Murder. The remaining 16 episodes will air after the winter break, beginning on January 29, 2015.

Writing 
During an interview, Shonda Rhimes stated that "Season 11 is really a Meredith-centric season. She lost her ‘person’, her half-sister has shown up, her husband is chafing to go someplace else..." She went on to reveal that she's been wanting to do the "familial grenade" storyline for a long time, and at the end of Season 10, she knew it was the time to do it. Rhimes also claimed that Season 11 will pick up right where Season 10 left us, so there won't be much that the audience won't see. In another interview, Rhimes revealed that she and the writers were thinking about doing flashback periods to the younger days of Dr. Ellis Grey and Dr. Richard Webber. Sarah Drew's character Dr. April Kepner became pregnant at the end of the tenth season, which coincided with Drew's real-life pregnancy.

Casting 
On August 13, 2013, Sandra Oh revealed that she would be leaving after Season 10 of Grey's Anatomy, making the eleventh season the first season in which Dr. Cristina Yang did not appear. It was announced on March 25, 2014, that Gaius Charles and Tessa Ferrer did not receive a contract renewal for the eleventh season, and left at the end of the tenth season. Jerrika Hinton and Camilla Luddington however, returned as residents for the eleventh season. On January 23, 2014, it was reported that Ellen Pompeo and Patrick Dempsey had renewed their contracts for another 3 seasons, as Meredith Grey and Derek Shepherd, respectively, meaning their characters would be staying on the medical drama for seasons 11 and 12. On May 2, 2014, the rest of the 6 original cast mates, Justin Chambers, Chandra Wilson and James Pickens Jr., excluding Sandra Oh, renewed their contracts for another 2 seasons (11 and 12) as Drs. Alex Karev, Miranda Bailey, and Richard Webber, respectively. Sara Ramirez also renewed her contract for another 2 seasons as Dr. Callie Torres.

E! News reported on June 23, 2014, that Caterina Scorsone was upgraded to a series-regular to continue her role as Dr. Amelia Shepherd, one of Dr. Derek Shepherd's 4 sisters. Scorsone had played the character since the seventh season as a recurring role, and played the character as a series-regular on the show's spin-off series, Private Practice. After speculations about who would portray the character Ellis Grey, either Kate Burton or Sarah Paulson, it was announced that Sally Pressman would replace Paulson as Ellis in flashbacks with J. August Richards reprising his role as a young Richard Webber in the same episode. On August 6, 2014, it was confirmed that Burton would return to portray Ellis in flashbacks. 

Geena Davis was announced to appear in the season and would have a major guest arc as Dr. Nicole Herman, a fetal surgeon at Grey Sloan Memorial Hospital. On September 2, 2014, Annet Mahendru of The Americans was announced to guest star for 1 episode, and she played Ana, an undocumented immigrant whose daughter had an 8-pound tumor. It was announced on September 23, 2014, that Connie Ray, known from Space Jam and Stuart Little, would guest star as Dr. April Kepner's mother, Karen, and would appear in the sixth episode. On October 23, 2014, Kelly McCreary was promoted to a series-regular after being credited as guest-starring until the eleventh episode. On April 15, 2015, Reign alum Giacomo Gianniotti was announced to be cast on the show as a possible recurring role for Season 12. On April 28, 2015, it was announced that Joe Adler was cast for the show, and would appear in the final 2 episodes of the season.

Despite signing on for 2 more years after the tenth season, Patrick Dempsey decided that the eleventh season would be his last. The announcement was made on April 23, 2015, just a few hours before his final episode, "How to Save a Life", premiered. Showrunner Shonda Rhimes spoke out about the departure as she said "Derek Shepherd is and will always be an incredibly important character—for Meredith, for me and for the fans. I absolutely never imagined saying goodbye to our ‘McDreamy.’"

Filming 
Not even a week after the Season 10 finale episode aired, the Grey's Anatomy team of writers began collaborating on ideas for Season 11 storylines. Shonda Rhimes tweeted that they were hard at work in the writing room, but would have the month of June off before coming back in full swing to write actual episodes. After the 4th of July weekend, Rhimes tweeted that the writers' room was once again buzzing, as the team had returned from vacation to start writing new episodes for Season 11. Camilla Luddington confirmed that the filming for the eleventh season would begin on July 25, 2014.

Reception

Ratings 
Grey's Anatomy's eleventh season opened up to 10.14 million viewers with a 3.1/11 Nielsen rating/share in the 18–49 demographic. The premiere episode "I Must Have Lost it on the Wind", was the season's most-viewed episode. "When I Grow Up" was the season and series' least-viewed episode, with 6.64 million viewers and a 1.9/7 Nielsen rating/share in the 18–49 demographic. The season finale was the series lowest-watched season finale with 8.33 million viewers and 2.2/8 in the 18–49 rating demo.

Grey's Anatomy, in its eleventh season, ranked #36 overall in total viewers (11.08 million). This is much lower than Season 10, which was ranked #15. In the 18–49 key demographic, Grey's Anatomy ranked #13 (the lowest ranking in the series' history). The highest ranking for the 18–49 key demographic was #3 for seasons 3, 4, and 5. Last season, Grey's Anatomy was ranked #5. For the 2014-2015 primetime TV schedule, Grey's Anatomy was the ##1 drama in the 18–49 key demographic.

Live + SD ratings

Live + 7 Day (DVR) ratings

Critical response 
The first half of the season opened to critical acclaim with many calling it the best season in the past few year;, the second-half, however, garnered mixed reviews. With Season 11 being the first in Grey's Anatomy history to be without Cristina Yang, TV.com wrote, "So, the question I had heading into Grey's Anatomy'''s Season 11 premiere was just how much Cristina's absence would be felt. And at the end, I have to say-while the lack of Yang was definitely noticeable, I think the show will be just fine with out her."

Perhaps the biggest storyline of Season 11 was the death of Derek Shepherd. After his last episode, "How to Save a Life" premiered, many fans were outraged with Shonda Rhimes for how the episode was written and vowed to never watch the show again. Samantha Highfill of Entertainment Weekly wrote: "Of all the ways he could’ve gone—dying while saving that family in a shocking but heroic moment, or dying at Grey Sloan and getting a chance to say goodbye to everyone—this felt cheap. And quite frankly, it felt a little rude to the man himself. He was called McDreamy for a reason, and he deserved better than this." Citing the storylines of Derek's death, Callie and Arizona splitting up, and April and Jackson losing their baby, The Hollywood Reporter wrote that Season 11 is one of the most depressing seasons of Grey's Anatomy.

Despite all that, the season garnered positive reviews. Entertainment Weekly wrote, "It's nice to see Grey's pull back on the throttle on its soap opera tendencies (and I hate using that word as pejorative) and aim for drama that feels a bit more grounded." TV Fanatic gave a hugely positive review stating, "The acting remains stellar, the drama is mixed with just the right amount of humor and darn it if I'm not now wrapped up in the future of MerDer." TV Equals stated that, "This season certainly had its strong points, the sad loss of April and Jackson's son was a tearjerker in all the right ways. It was great to see Amelia move past an uncomfortable incident with someone from her past and go on to save Dr. Herman’s life. Maggie Pierce was a great addition to the show and the writers managed to revisit this premise in a way that felt fresh. The storyline was also well-paced and it’s been great to watch Maggie become a larger part of Meredith’s life and to watch her get fully integrated into Grey Sloan." BuddyTV gave the finale a positive review, "'You're My Home' proved to be so bright and shiny. This is an episode that nearly could have served as a series finale, though we know that is not the case. Indeed, a few characters notwithstanding, most of our beloved surgeons are in a shockingly good place as season 11 draws to a close." adding, "I was very impressed tonight as Meredith, who can be very selfish but - in fairness - has suffered great personal loss in the death of Derek, stepped up to the plate on behalf of others.  When one considers how this character has grown over 11 seasons, it really is amazing. Kudos to Ellen Pompeo for her fine work. She's actually done the impossible, because I actually care what happens to Meredith Grey in season 12." The episode "Only Mama Knows" received high critical acclaim with numerous critics calling it "one of the best of Grey's". Spoilertv lauded the episode and wrote, "Outstanding! It’s been a very long time since an episode came along which truly lived and breathed the very core of Grey’s Anatomy. It was faithfully and beautifully written, directed, edited and acted." Entertainment Weekly called the show a "great drama series" stating, "It was also throwing us back to the type of episode we expected from this show in the early seasons, the type of episode that gave you chills and reminded you why this show is so good at drama."  

Ellen Pompeo garnered high critical acclaim towards the latter-half of the season for her portrayal of Meredith Grey. Rick Porter of Zap2it lauded Pompeo's performance in "How to Save a Life", may not be the ideal Emmy-submission episode for Ellen Pompeo, considering Meredith is off-screen for more than half of it. But it's among the best work she's ever done on the show." USA Today'' also lauded Pompeo's performance saying, " In some ways, the episode was even more of a showcase for Pompeo. She didn't play a prominent part until late in the hour, but she had some of the more memorable and well-played scenes, from her angry response to the doctor who tries to tell her what her choices are, to her resignation when she realizes she has to comfort and motivate the young doctor whose mistakes cost Derek his life." Reviewing the episode "She's Leaving Home", Matt Carter commended on the show's "shocking" longevity and that it "is still in a position where it makes sense." He also praised Pompeo's performance as "great throughout" and "overlooked."

DVD release

References 

2014 American television seasons
2015 American television seasons
Grey's Anatomy seasons